Merungle Hill  is a village community in the central north part of the Riverina. It is situated by road, about 3 kilometres north of Yanco and 5 kilometres south east of Leeton.

Notes and references

Towns in the Riverina
Towns in New South Wales
Leeton Shire